The Air Force Reserve Officer Training Corps (AFROTC) is one of the three primary commissioning sources for officers in the United States Air Force and United States Space Force, the other two being the United States Air Force Academy (USAFA) and Air Force Officer Training School (OTS). A subordinate command of the Air University within the Air Education and Training Command (AETC), AFROTC is aligned under the Jeanne M. Holm Center for Officer Accessions and Citizen Development at Maxwell AFB, Alabama. The Holm Center, formerly known as the Air Force Officer Accession and Training Schools (AFOATS), retains direct responsibility for both AFROTC and OTS.

AFROTC is the largest and oldest source of commissioned officers for the U.S. Air Force. AFROTC's stated mission is to produce quality leaders for the U.S. Air Force. AFROTC units are located on 145 college and university campuses with 1100+ additional institutions of higher learning participating in cross-town agreements that allow their students to attend AFROTC classes at a nearby "host" college or university. According to AFROTC HQ, in 2006, AFROTC commissioned 2,083 USAF Second Lieutenants, with AFROTC enrollment ranging from 23,605 in 1985 to 10,231 in 1993, and around 13,000 enrolled today.

AFROTC units at colleges and universities are called "detachments," and are headed by an active duty USAF officer in the rank of colonel or lieutenant colonel who functions as both the Detachment Commander for USAF purposes and with the nominal title of professor of aerospace studies (PAS) within the institution's academic community. Most colleges and universities will designate the AFROTC detachment as the Department of Aerospace Studies. Depending on the detachment size, the PAS is typically assisted by one to four assistant professors of aerospace studies (APAS), also all active-duty USAF officers. Most APAS hold the rank of captain; however, some are also first lieutenants or majors. Approximately three USAF non-commissioned officers and one senior non-commissioned officer will typically provide military administrative support and are often augmented by one to two civilian staff support employees of the academic institution. Larger detachments may also have a Lieutenant Colonel serve as a vice commander.

Within AFROTC detachments, the students (referred to as "cadets") are organized into wings, groups, squadrons, and flights, mirroring the USAF functional wing structure. The AFROTC detachment's cadet wing or cadet group is separated into two divisions: the General Military Course (GMC) consisting of the first two years of training, and the Professional Officer Course (POC) consisting of the last two years of training. The AFROTC program is also divided into two training functions: the Academic Classroom Program (Aerospace Studies classes) and Cadet Activities (i.e., Leadership Laboratory, Physical Training, and other training).

Aerospace Studies (AS) 
Aerospace Studies (AS) classes are the academic portion of AFROTC. The General Military Course (GMC) is a two-year course, consisting of AS100 and AS200 cadets, designed to motivate and prepare cadets for entry into the Professional Officer Course (POC). Each AS100 and AS200 course is designed as a weekly, one academic-hour course. The POC is a two-year course, consisting of AS300 and AS400, designed to prepare cadets for active duty as Air Force officers. Each course in the POC is designed as a weekly, three academic-hour course. Specific topics covered in the AS classes are as follows:

AS100 – Heritage and Values of the Air Force: Structure and missions of Air Force organizations, officership, and professionalism. Introduction to communication skills.

AS200 – Team and Leadership Fundamentals: Beginnings of manned flight and the development of aerospace power from World War I to present-day current operations.

AS300 – Leading People and Effective Communication: Anatomy of leadership, role of discipline in leadership situations, and the variable affecting leadership. Case studies and practical application in Leadership Laboratory (LLAB). The current AS300 curriculum was previously taught as the AS400 curriculum until the 1990s, when it was shifted to the junior year.

AS400 – National Security Affairs/Preparation for Active Duty: The role of the professional military leaders in a democratic society, international developments on strategic preparedness, and active-duty assignment preparation. The National Security Studies portion of the current AS400 curriculum was previously taught as the AS300 curriculum until the 1990s, when it was shifted to the senior year.

The AS400 program also previously included a single academic term Flight Instruction Program (FIP) private pilot ground school course. This course was mandatory for all cadets slated for undergraduate pilot training on graduation who did not already hold a private pilot certificate or higher, and was optional for all other cadets. FIP was eliminated from AFROTC in 1991.

Leadership Laboratory (LLAB) 
Leadership Laboratory (LLAB) is a weekly 2-hour pass/fail class that trains and prepares cadets for Field Training (FT), develops leadership skills, and promotes esprit de corps among all cadets. At some universities, credit hours may be given for completing LLAB; often universities only give credit hours for completing AS classes. For GMC cadets, LLAB provides new cadets with basic skills and knowledge to be a functional member of the cadet corps, prepares them in Warrior Knowledge and Drill and Ceremonies (marching), and teaches leadership, followership, and teamwork skills. For POC cadets, LLAB furthers leadership and followership skills learned at FT by planning and implementing the activities under the supervision of the active-duty cadre.

Specific LLAB activities are determined by the detachments themselves and thus vary across the nation. Some specific activities include: Field trips to Air Force bases and stations (to include Air Force Reserve and Air National Guard installations), Field Days, physical fitness tests and competitions, Drill and Ceremonies, leadership-building exercises, and Air Force officer career days.

Scholarship programs 
AFROTC offers a variety of highly competitive college scholarships, ranging from 3-year and 4-year scholarships offered to graduating high school seniors, 2-year and 3-year scholarships to college students enrolled as AFROTC cadets, and 2-, 3- and 4-year scholarships offered to enlisted military personnel.

AFROTC Scholarships offered to high school seniors are categorized as follows:

Type 1: Pays full college tuition, most fees and $900 per year for books. Approximately 5 percent of AFROTC four-year scholarship winners will be offered a Type 1 scholarship, mostly in technical fields such as engineering, chemistry, meteorology, applied mathematics or computer science.

Type 2: Pays college tuition and most fees up to $18,000 per year and $900 per year for books. Approximately 20 percent of AFROTC four-year scholarship winners will be offered a Type 2 scholarship, again, mostly in technical fields. Students pay the difference when attending an institution where the tuition exceeds $18,000 per year. All three-year scholarships are Type 2.

Type 7: Pays college tuition up to the equivalent of the in-state rate and $900 per year for books. If a student receives a Type 7 offer but wishes to attend a college/university where they do not qualify under the guidelines above, the student can convert the four-year Type 7 scholarship to a three-Year Type 2 scholarship. A Type 7 scholarship cannot be activated at a non-qualifying school where the student pays the difference.

AFROTC Scholarships offered to in-college students are as follows:

In-College Scholarship Program (ICSP): Open to college freshmen and sophomores in any major. Program is divided into two selection phases and awards-

ICSP Phase One: Open only to students enrolled in the Air Force ROTC program. Eligible applicants are nominated for ICSP Phase One by their school’s AFROTC detachment commander. Nominees for each detachment are rank-ordered by the detachment commander based on their leadership ability, grades, fitness, and overall participation in the Air Force ROTC program. Headquarters AFROTC makes the final decision and awards scholarships. The nomination deadline is between 10 February and 28 February of each year.

All cadets selected through ICSP Phase One are awarded a Type 2 scholarship (capped at $18,000 per year for tuition, $600 per year for books).

Freshman nominees are awarded three-year scholarships and sophomore nominees are awarded two-year scholarships. All scholarships activate the following fall term.

ICSP Phase Two: Open to college freshman and sophomores in any major. ICSP Phase One nonselects and students not enrolled in Air Force ROTC are eligible to apply for ICSP Phase Two. Eligible applicants are nominated for ICSP Phase Two by the commander of the detachment serving the school where they attend or the school where they will attend once they join Air Force ROTC. Students not currently enrolled in Air Force ROTC must be interviewed by the detachment commander or his/her designee. The deadline for detachments to submit a nomination is 30 June. The board meets in July, and those selected are typically notified by 1 August of each year.

A limited number of cadets selected through ICSP Phase Two are awarded a Type 2 scholarship (capped at $18,000 per year for tuition, $600 per year for books). Most scholarship selected students are awarded a Type 3 scholarship (capped at $9,000 per year for tuition and $600 per year for books).

Freshmen nominees are awarded three-year scholarships, and sophomore nominees are awarded two-year scholarships. All scholarships activate the fall term following their distribution.

ICSP Phase Three: Depending on officer production and funding, a limited number of qualified sophomore ICSP Phase Two nonselects may be offered Type 6 scholarships. This process takes place at the same time ICSP Phase Two results are released.

Express Scholarship: Designed to meet Air Force ROTC officer production requirements in specific fields and year groups. This program awards Type 1 scholarships paying full college tuition, most fees and $600 per year for books. In many cases, these scholarships can activate during the same term as nomination. The Express Scholarship program is operated on a fully qualified basis. Those students who meet the qualifications are awarded the scholarship and do not meet a scholarship selection board. The processing of the scholarship award is completed at the local AFROTC detachment. Eligible majors are Computer Engineering, Electrical Engineering, Environmental Engineering and Meteorology.

Express Scholarship (Foreign Language): Designed to meet Air Force ROTC officer production requirements in specific fields and year groups. This program awards Type 1 scholarships paying full college tuition, most fees and $600 per year for books. In many cases, these scholarships can activate during the same term as nomination. The Express Scholarship (Foreign Language) program is operated on a fully qualified basis. Those students who meet the qualifications are awarded the scholarship and do not meet a scholarship selection board. The processing of the scholarship award is completed at the local AFROTC detachment. Eligible majors are:  Arabic, Azerbaijani, Bengali, Cambodian, Chinese, Hausa, Hindi, Indonesian, Japanese, Kasakh, Kurdish, Malay, Pashtu, Persian-Iranian/Persian-Afghan, Russian, Serbo-Croatian, Swahili, Thai, Turkish, Uighur, Urdu/Punjabi, Uzbek and Vietnamese. Most candidates will eventually become USAF officers in the Intelligence career field.

AFROTC Scholarships offered to enlisted military personnel are as follows:

Airman Scholarship and Commissioning Program (ASCP)*: Permits active duty USAF airmen and junior non-commissioned officers to separate from active duty and receive a scholarship worth up to $18,000 per year while pursuing their commission through Air Force ROTC.
(* Previously known as Bootstrap Program.)

Professional Officer Course – Early Release Program (POC-ERP): Offers active duty Air Force enlisted personnel an opportunity for an early release from active duty to enter AFROTC and receive a commission as an Air Force officer. Members selected for POC-ERP will separate from active duty, sign a contract with AFROTC and become full-time college students. This program is open to undergraduate degrees only and cannot be used for postgraduate degrees. Upon completion of all undergraduate degree and commissioning requirements, cadets are commissioned as second lieutenants and returned to active duty in USAF for a period of at least four years, with longer service commitments required for those selected for flight training. POC-ERP is open to all academic majors. While in AFROTC, individuals will no longer receive military pay or benefits. All members applying for POC-ERP are required to provide proof that they have the financial means to make it through the program. Enlisted personnel selected for POC-ERP may use their Montgomery GI Bill benefits while in the program along with any additional grants or scholarships for which they may qualify.

Scholarships for Outstanding Airman to ROTC (SOAR):  The SOAR program allows USAF enlisted personnel to separate from active duty and receive a scholarship worth up to $18,000 per year while pursuing their commission through AFROTC. Students may not pay the difference to attend higher-cost schools.

Nurse Enlisted Commissioning Program (NECP):  The Nurse Enlisted Commissioning Program (NECP) offers active duty Air Force enlisted personnel the opportunity to earn a commission while completing their bachelor's degree in nursing. NECP students graduate, take the NCLEX, and then attend COT. Students will attend COT upon completion of their bachelor's degree and this will be their commissioning source. Those selected for NECP remain on active duty and are administratively assigned to an Air Force ROTC detachment. Their duty is to attend school as a full-time college student. NECP cadets may participate in the program for up to 24 consecutive months, depending on prior academic preparation and age limitations. During the program, they attend school year-round to include summer terms.

Cadet organization 
AFROTC classifies cadets into the following basic categories of training with respect to Field Training attendance and commissioning:

Initial Military Training (IMT): Cadets who are part of the GMC but are not scheduled to attend FT the following summer. Normally AS100 cadets.

Field Training Preparation (FTP): Cadets scheduled to attend FT in the upcoming summer. Normally AS200 cadets, or if dual-enrolled in AS100 and AS200 classes, AS250 cadets.

Intermediate Cadet Leader (ICL): Cadets who have successfully completed FT but are not scheduled to commission in the upcoming year. Normally AS300 cadets.

Senior Cadet Leader (SCL): Cadets who have satisfactorily completed FT and are scheduled to be commissioned in the upcoming year. Normally AS400 cadets.

Extended Cadet Leader (ECL): Cadets who have completed the AFROTC curriculum but need additional time to complete their academic degree, such as 5-year engineering program students. Normally AS700 cadets or, if on scholarship, AS800 cadets.

A Cadet who has completed the first two years of academic classes but did not pass Field Training or attain a FT slot is an AS500 cadet.

Detachments organize cadets after the active-duty wing structure to the best of their ability, compensating for variable sizes and circumstances. GMC cadets participate as the underclassmen while the POC cadets participate as the upperclassmen. POC cadets have completed Field Training and are assigned leadership positions in the corps. Cadets are classified and assigned rank commensurate with their position and level of responsibility within the cadet wing and with respect to FT completion.

General Military Course 
General Military Course cadets (formerly Cadet Airmen) are all cadets who have not satisfactorily completed Field Training. AS100 IMT cadets hold the Cadet Fourth Class (C/4C) rank while AS200 FTP cadets hold Cadet Third Class Rank (C/3C). GMC cadets are not committed to joining the Air Force unless on AFROTC scholarship. If contracted, AS100 cadets receive a monthly tax-free stipend of $300 while AS200 cadets receive $350.

GMC cadets on contract are also considered to be inactive enlisted members of the Air Force Reserve serving without pay, ranging from Airman Basic (AB, pay grade E-1) to Staff Sergeant (SSgt, pay grade E-5) with higher grades based on prior enlisted military experience in the Active or Reserve Components or other qualifying credentials (i.e., senior Civil Air Patrol cadets or former high school AFJROTC cadets with four years of participation enlisting at Airman First Class {A1C, E-3}, etc.).

Professional Officer Course 
Professional Officer Course cadets (formerly Cadet Officers), AS300 (ICL), AS400 (SCL), and AS700 (ECL), are cadets who have satisfactorily completed Field Training or have received a Field Training deferment. POC cadets wear cadet officer rank (Cadet Second Lieutenant (C/2d Lt) – Cadet Colonel (C/Col)). Unlike the Air Force Academy, for juniors and seniors there is no rank of Cadet Second Class or Cadet First Class, respectively. With some exceptions, all POC cadets are considered to be "on contract" and are committed to joining the Air Force upon completion of their academic degree.

Like GMC cadets on contract, POC cadets are considered to be inactive enlisted members of the Air Force Reserve, serving without pay between the grades of E-1 and E-5, with said enlisted status terminating upon commissioning. However, POC cadets are not subject to the Uniform Code of Military Justice (UCMJ) and thus in strictly legal cases (such as sexual assault occurring within the cadet corps) they are considered "civilian." As contracted cadets, AS300 cadets also receive a monthly tax-free stipend of $450 and AS400 cadets receive $500. POC cadets are required to meet USAF height and weight standards, pass the Fitness Assessment (FA) each academic semester, and meet a minimum cumulative and term GPA requirement of 2.5. Repeatedly failing to meet the standards may result in disenrollment from AFROTC. All POC cadets also must hold at least one leadership position within the cadet wing or group as designated by the detachment cadre's Commandant of Cadets (COC).

In some cases, students with academic requirements that exceed four years (usually engineers and other technical majors in five-year programs) continue the AFROTC program for additional semesters as needed. During these additional years these cadets (AS700 or AS800, if on scholarship) are only minimally required to participate in LLAB and maintain retention standards. It is important to note that this is not the case for schools with co-op programs that entail a total of four years of classes and one year of cooperative experience. In these cases the cadets are classified as AS300's their first POC year and AS400's their second and third POC years. The cadets will not attend aerospace classes, Physical Training, or Leadership Lab during their co-op blocks (they will be on Periods of Non-Attendance) and otherwise complete the program like any four-year major.

Cadet Wing 
The cadet wing (cadet group at smaller detachments) is organized to mirror the active-duty objective wing structure and is composed entirely of AFROTC cadets. Cadet rank is determined by the positions and levels of responsibility in which they hold. Cadet wings strive to include positions similar to those found in active-duty wings but additional positions may be added at the discretion of the detachment cadre's COC. Each wing is headed by a Cadet Colonel and has subsequent groups, squadrons, and flights. POC cadets rotate positions each semester and cannot hold the same position for two consecutive periods without approval. POC cadets are required to serve at least one term in a leadership position. Leadership positions include wing, group, squadron, and flight positions and others named by the CW/CC.

Physical Training (PT) 

Cadets are required to take part in Physical Training (PT) at least twice per week each semester. Whether PT is counted as a school credit or not, attendance at PT (at least 75 percent) is required to pass Leadership Laboratory (LLAB). As a prerequisite, cadets must have a certified DoD physical or a sports physical on file at the detachment and must complete an AFROTC Physical Health Screening Questionnaire. Before the beginning of exercises, cadets receive a safety briefing on the "importance of hydration, heat stress disorders, and prompt reporting of any problems to a cadre member."

Under the supervision of qualified cadre, the PT program is organized and led by AS300 and AS400 cadets. PT activities at detachments may vary from sports games, Field Training Preparation training exercises, cardio and muscular strength exercises. PT sessions usually begin by forming up as a Wing and stretching.

The Fitness Assessment (FA) is taken by each cadet each semester and is formatted after the active-duty Air Force's FA. The FA is the primary instrument for evaluating the fitness level of each cadet. It is structured to assess the muscular endurance of specific muscle groups and the functional capacity of the cardiovascular system. Contracted cadets (i.e. those on scholarship/receiving stipend) must pass the FA. Contracted cadets that fail the FA are subject to discipline. Two consecutive failures can result in dismissal from the program. Non-contracted cadets must attempt the FA each semester. Within 72 hours of taking the FA, cadets have their height, waist, and weight measured to calculate body mass index (BMI). The FA consists of the BMI measurement, one minute of push-ups, one minute of sit-ups, and a 1.5-mile run. Maximum points for each area is 20 for BMI, 10 for push-ups, 10 for crunches, and 60 for the 1.5 mile run.  To pass the FA, cadets must obtain a composite score of at least 75 and meet the minimum score requirements in each category.

Field Training (FT) 
Field Training is a training program that takes place the summer before cadets enter the POC. Completion of this boot camp-style training is a mandatory program for all individuals qualified to pursue an Air Force commission through AFROTC. All FTP cadets compete among each other nationwide during the spring semester to receive an EA (Enrollment Allocation), which allows them to progress to FT. Cadets compete based on their Grade Point Average, Physical Fitness Assessment scores, and their ranking among other cadets in their class, as determined by the detachment commander. The number of EAs awarded is determined each year by the needs of the Air Force.

2008 marked the first year that all AFROTC Field Training Units (FTU) were held at the Officer Training School complex at Maxwell AFB, Alabama. This move reflects the Air Force's greater emphasis on expeditionary operations in combat zone and the Joint Force Training Center (JFTC) at Camp Shelby, Mississippi.

The Field Training program is designed to evaluate military leadership and discipline, determine the cadet's potential for entry into the Professional Officer Course (POC), and to stratify cadets amongst their peers. In- Garrison (12 days), and Joint Forces Training Center 
Field Training is currently 13 days long, however the length may change depending on the year. FT is split up into two sections: In-Garrison (located at Maxwell AFB) and Air Expeditionary Force (located at the Vigilant Warrior Training Center at Maxwell AFB). The In-Garrison portion focuses on academics and drill & ceremonies, while AEF part focuses on Expeditionary Skills Training (EST) and deployment, respectively.

Field Training is commanded by an active duty USAF Colonel and a staff of approximately 55 active duty USAF officers, non-commissioned officers, and cadet training assistants (CTA). Active duty FT staff are typically selected from cadre at AFROTC detachments and serve in four to six-week rotations. "CTAs are POC cadets selected, based on their FT performance and overall cadet record, to return to Field Training as assistants to active duty staff members." There is one Flight Training Officer and one CTA assigned to each flight. In addition to flight CTAs, there are also traditional CTAs (who focus on Drill & Ceremonies, Physical Training, Public Affairs, and Standardization).

The 2020 Field Training period will have two Field Training Units (FTUs) instead of three, meaning staff will serve for three Field Trainings (also known as Maxwells or Maxes) instead of two.

In recent years, Field Training has been shortened in order to provide more spending for Professional Development Training (such as base visits, internships, and other cadet development opportunities).

In each flight, cadets are ranked from first to last. The top 10% earn the distinction of "Distinguished Graduate". The rest of the cadets are ranked in one of three divisions in their respective flight: top, middle, or bottom third. Various other awards are given for excelling at physical fitness and warrior spirit.

Cadets' rankings depend on the following criteria:
 Preparation for Field Training
 Fitness Assessment (FA)
 Leadership skills
 Professional qualities
 Communication skills
 Judgment/decision-making skills
 Warrior Ethos

Only the active duty officers evaluate and stratify the cadets. CTAs often give input but do not officially evaluate cadets. Cadets who are ranked among the top third or better in their flight are recommended for CTA duty and have the option to apply to become CTAs the following year.

Career / Air Force Specialty Code (AFSC) selection

General AFSCs 
Generally speaking, most cadets will apply for their initial AFSC career field towards the end of their first semester in their AS 300 (junior) year. AFROTC cadets can apply for various career fields, to include aeronautically rated Pilot, Remotely Piloted Aircraft (RPA), Navigator/Combat Systems Officer and Air Battle Manager (ABM) slots, as well as non-rated slots such as Missile Operations or Missile Maintenance, Space Operations, Intelligence, Aircraft Maintenance, Meteorology, Civil Engineering, Security Forces, Admin/Personnel, etc. Cadets will be notified of their prospective AFSCs during the following semester.  The eventual duty station/ base of assignment for these various AFSCs will not be determined until midway through their first semester of their final year in school.

Rated candidates 
Cadets applying for rated slots, such as Pilot, RPA Pilot (MQ-9 Reaper), Navigator / Combat Systems Officer (CSO), and Air Battle Manager (ABM), will have the opportunity to apply no later than towards the end of the first semester of their second-to-last year (generally, the 1st semester of the academic junior year). These candidates will also be notified of their alternate AFSC (i.e., Intel, Space, Missiles, etc.) at the same time as all other cadets who applied for non-rated AFSCs. However, before candidates are eligible to apply for aeronautically rated positions, they must be medically qualified for their selection. There are different medical standards for pilots, nav/CSOs, and ABMs, respectively, with undergraduate pilot training medical requirements, primarily uncorrected eyesight, being the most stringent. Like OTS candidates, all AFROTC cadets must take the Air Force Officer Qualifying Test (AFOQT) prior to going on contract. The AFOQT contains Pilot and Navigator sections for prospective pilots and navs/CSOs. The pilot candidates must also take the Test of Basic Aviation Skills (TBAS) to determine the component score of the Pilot Candidate Selection Model (PCSM) rating. The PCSM rating is a component of the Order of Merit, which allows the USAF to rank-order every single pilot candidate in AFROTC, and determine who gets what undergraduate pilot training (UPT) slot. Once the requirements are met for application, the candidates can apply at this time for specific flight training options at the following Air Education and Training Command (AETC) locations:

Pilots can opt for Euro-NATO Joint Jet Pilot Training (ENJJPT) with the 80th Flying Training Wing (80 FTW) at Sheppard AFB, Texas, which will take the top 9-10% of the pilot candidates that wish to pursue ENJJPT in lieu of traditional Specialized UPT (SUPT).  ENJJPT selection is based solely off the Order of Merit scores and rank-order.

SUPT options include the 14th Flying Training Wing (14 FTW) at Columbus AFB, Mississippi; the 47th Flying Training Wing (47 FTW) at Laughlin AFB, Texas; and the 71st Flying Training Wing (71 FTW) at Vance AFB, Oklahoma.

A final pilot training option is the rotary-wing and tilt-rotor track via Undergraduate Helicopter Pilot Training (UHT) with the 23d Flying Training Squadron (23 FTS) at Fort Rucker, Alabama.

Combat Systems Officers, formerly known as Navigators, will receive their undergraduate CSO flight training with AETC's 479th Flying Training Group (479 FTG), a tenant USAF organization at Naval Air Station Pensacola, Florida.

Aeronautically rated candidates will be notified of their rated selection or denial during their second semester of their junior year. Base assignments, including ENJJPT assignment, will be given midway through their first semester of the last year in college. Those cadets who were selected for rated slots are then allowed to wear a flight suit during specified LLABs where the Airman Battle Uniform (ABU) or the woodland camouflage Battle Dress Uniform (BDU) is the Uniform of the Day, unless otherwise noted by the Cadet Wing Commander or Cadet Group Commander. Once selected, pilot-selected cadets will contract with the USAF for 10 years of active duty USAF service following completion of flight training, nav/CSO-selected and ABM-selected cadets will contract for 6 years of active duty following flight training, while cadets in all other AFSCs will contract for four years after commissioning.

Pilot candidates also undergo a Flying Class I physical and navigator/CSO candidates a Flying Class IA physical during the first semester of their last year. These are the most stringent physical exams given by the USAF. ABM candidates will undergo a Flying Class III physical exam. If a cadet with a rated slot is unable to pass their flight physical, they will instead be assigned to a non-rated career field.

Flight Indoctrination Program (FIP) 

Prior to 1991, AFROTC also conducted a Flight Instruction Program (FIP) parallel to the Pilot Indoctrination Program (PIP) at USAFA. Although often touted as a means for AFROTC cadets to earn a free FAA Private Pilot Certificate while in college, the actual intent of the program was to provide an additional flight training screening process for prospective USAF pilot candidates who had no prior flight experience.

In AFROTC, FIP consisted of two blocks, the first being a private pilot ground school course taught by an aeronautically rated USAF officer assigned to the AFROTC detachment's cadre. The ground school course was also given an AS400 series designation and open to all AFROTC cadets in their senior year regardless of selection or non-selection for USAF undergraduate pilot training. Cadets who had prior civilian flight training and/or civilian pilot certifications could also enroll in the FIP ground school and the course was also offered as option for Army ROTC cadets, Naval ROTC (NROTC) midshipmen on both Navy and Marine Corps commissioning tracks, Naval Aviation Reserve Officer Candidates (AVROC) and Marine Corps Platoon Leaders Class-Air (Marine PLC-Air) officer candidates slated for flight training in their respective services following graduation.

The flying portion of FIP was typically conducted by civilian instructors under USAF contract at a nearby civilian airport, normally employing light general aviation aircraft such as the Cessna 150 / Cessna 152 series, Cessna 172, Piper Cherokee, or other similar aircraft. Since FIP was designed as a washout/attrition device, AFROTC cadets who already held an FAA Private Pilot's Certificate or greater were not eligible for any actual flight time via FIP. Those cadets without prior flight experience initially received 38 flight hours, but post-Vietnam War defense cutbacks in the mid-1970s resulted in FIP being reduced to a "safe for solo" program with 25 hours of funded flight time. FIP was discontinued in 1991 when it was replaced by the single-site Enhanced Flight Screening Program (EFSP) at Hondo, Texas.

Initial Flight Training (IFT) and Navigator Introductory Flight Training (NIFT) 

With the demise of FIP and PIP in 1991, the 12th Flying Training Wing (12 FTW) at Randolph AFB, Texas initially assumed responsibility for the Enhanced Flight Screening Program (EFSP) of all candidates for UPT from all USAF commissioning sources (AFROTC, USAFA and OTS). This training was conducted for these officers following graduation and commissioning at Hondo Municipal Airport, Texas in T-41 Mescalero and T-3 Firefly aircraft until 1998. Following several fatal mishaps with the T-3 Firefly, the program was transferred from the 12 FTW to a civilian contract operation under AETC auspices at Pueblo Memorial Airport, Colorado.

The Pueblo program employs civilian Diamond DA-20 aircraft and is officially known as Initial Flight Training (IFT) for USAF specialized undergraduate pilot trainees and Navigator Introductory Flight Training (NIFT) for USAF specialized undergraduate navigator/CSO trainees.

Ribbons 
AFROTC ribbons are awarded for many various achievements. The complete list is below as per AFROTCVA 36-3, 4 May.

Badges and pins 

In addition, cadets who have completed Advanced Course in Engineering (ACE) or have attended AFIT courses on information assurance are authorized to wear the Cadet Master Cyber Badge.

Notable Air Force ROTC graduates 
 James P. Fleming, Medal of Honor Recipient; Colonel, USAF (ret.) – Washington State University
 Jimmie V. Adams, former Commander, Pacific Air Forces (PACAF); General, USAF (ret.) – Auburn University
 Michael P. Anderson, Astronaut; Lieutenant Colonel, USAF (deceased) – University of Washington
 Rudolf Anderson Jr, U-2 pilot during (and only casualty of) the Cuban Missile Crisis, first Air Force Cross recipient (posthumous); Major, USAF (Deceased) – Clemson University
 Ricardo Aponte, Brigadier General, USAFR (ret.) – University of Puerto Rico
 Andrew Armacost, Dean of Faculty, United States Air Force Academy, Brigadier General, USAF – Northwestern University
 Robert Armfield, Brigadier General, USAF, Vice Director, Strategy, Plans and Policy on the staff of U.S. Central Command at MacDill Air Force Base, Florida. The Citadel, The Military College of South Carolina
 Joseph W. Ashy, former Commander, U.S. Space Command (USSPACECOM) and North American Aerospace Defense Command (NORAD); General, USAF (ret.) – Texas A&M University
 George T. Babbitt Jr., former Commander, Air Force Materiel Command (AFMC);, General, USAF (ret.) – University of Washington
 Dr. Thomas P. Ball, Commander, Joint Military Medical Command, Major General, USAF (ret.) – The Citadel, The Military College of South Carolina
 Charles B. DeBellevue, ranking fighter ace during Vietnam War and Air Force Cross recipient; Colonel, USAF (ret.) – University of Southwestern Louisiana
 Steven L. Bennett, Medal of Honor recipient (posthumous); Captain, USAF (deceased) – University of Louisiana at Lafayette
 Gerald A. Black, Commander 349th Air Mobility Wing, Brigadier General, USAFR (ret.) – The Citadel, The Military College of South Carolina
 Casey Blake, Deputy Assistant Secretary for Contracting, Office of the Assistant Secretary of the Air Force for Acquisition, Major General, USAF – The Citadel, The Military College of South Carolina
 Guion Bluford, Astronaut; Colonel, USAF (ret.) – Penn State University
 Billy J. Boles, former Commander, Air Education and Training Command (AETC); General, USAF (ret.) – North Carolina State University
 Claude M. Bolton, Assistant Secretary of the Army for Acquisition, Logistics and Technology; former Commander, Air Force Security Assistance Center; Major General, USAF (ret.) – University of Nebraska
 John A. Bradley, former Chief of Air Force Reserve and Commander, Air Force Reserve Command (AFRC); Lieutenant General, USAFR (ret.) – University of Tennessee at Knoxville
 Roger A. Brady, former Commander, U.S. Air Forces in Europe (USAFE); General, USAF (ret.) – University of Oklahoma
 Philip M. Breedlove, Commander, U.S. European Command, and 17th Supreme Allied Commander Europe (SACEUR) of NATO Allied Command Operations, General, USAF – Georgia Tech
 Mark N. Brown, Astronaut; Colonel, USAF (ret.) – Purdue University
 Frank B. Campbell, Director J-5, Joint Chiefs of Staff; former Commander 12th Air Force and U.S. Southern Command Air Forces, Lieutenant General, USAF (ret.) – The Citadel, The Military College of South Carolina
 Bruce Carlson, Director, National Reconnaissance Office (NRO); former Commander, Air Force Materiel Command (AFMC); General, USAF (ret.) – University of Minnesota Duluth
 Duane G. Carey, Astronaut; Lieutenant Colonel, USAF (ret.) – University of Minnesota
 John T. Chain Jr., former Commander, Strategic Air Command (SAC); General, USAF (ret.) – Denison University
 James R. Clapper Jr., Director of National Intelligence; former Director, Defense Intelligence Agency (DIA); Lieutenant General, USAF (ret.) – University of Maryland, College Park
 Catherine Coleman, Astronaut; Colonel, USAF (ret.) – Massachusetts Institute of Technology
 Eileen Collins, Astronaut and first female Space Shuttle Commander; Colonel, USAF (ret.) – Syracuse University
 J. Quincy Collins, F-105 pilot, captured in Vietnam, served as a Prisoner of War (POW) in the "Hanoi Hilton" for 7 years; his cellmate was John McCain 2008 Republican Presidential Nominee, Colonel, USAF (ret.) – The Citadel, The Military College of South Carolina
 Donald G. Cook, former Commander, Air Education and Training Command (AETC); General, USAF (ret.) – Michigan State University
 Lee Cooke, former Mayor of Austin, Texas, Captain, USAF – Louisiana Tech University
 John B. Cooper, Deputy Chief of Staff for Logistics, Engineering and Force Protection, Headquarters U.S. Air Force, Lieutenant General, USAF – The Citadel, The Military College of South Carolina
 William B. Davidson, Administrative Assistant to the Secretary of the Air Force, Senior Executive Service; Colonel, USAF (ret.) – Florida State University
 Roger G. DeKok, former Vice Commander, Air Force Space Command (AFSPC); Lieutenant General, USAF (ret., deceased)
 David A. Deptula, Deputy Chief of Staff for Intelligence, Surveillance and Reconnaissance (A2), HQ USAF; Lieutenant General, USAF – University of Virginia
 William J. Elander, former USAF Thunderbirds Demonstration Pilot, captured and was tortured at the "Hanoi Hilton" in Vietnam, Lieutenant Colonel, USAF (ret.) – The Citadel, The Military College of South Carolina
 Joseph Henry Engle, Astronaut; Colonel, USAF (ret.) – University of Kansas
 John M. Fabian, Astronaut; Colonel, USAF (ret.) – Washington State University
 Ed Fienga, Deputy Assistant Secretary for Programs, Office of the Assistant Secretary of the Air Force for Financial Management and Comptroller; Brigadier General, USAF – The Citadel, The Military College of South Carolina
 Michael Fincke, Astronaut; Colonel, USAF – Massachusetts Institute of Technology
 Bernard Francis Fisher, Medal of Honor recipient; Colonel, USAF (ret.) – University of Utah
 Robert H. Foglesong, former President of Mississippi State University; former Commander, U.S. Air Forces in Europe (USAFE); General, USAF (ret.) – West Virginia University
 Michael E. Fossum, Astronaut; Colonel, USAFR – Texas A&M University
 William M. Fraser III, Commander, Air Combat Command (ACC); General, USAF – Texas A&M University
 Patrick K. Gamble, former Commander, Pacific Air Forces (PACAF); General, USAF (ret.) – Texas A&M University
 Jim Geringer, former Governor of Wyoming; former Captain, USAF – Kansas State University
 John A. Gordon, former Deputy Director of Central Intelligence, Central Intelligence Agency (CIA); General, USAF (ret.) – University of Missouri
 Irwin P. Graham, former Deputy Chief of Staff Plans, Pacific Air Forces (PACAF); Major General, USAF (ret.) – The Citadel, The Military College of South Carolina
 Lindsey Graham, US Senator from South Carolina (R-SC); Colonel, USAFR – University of South Carolina
 George A. Gray III, Commander 438th Airlift Wing, Brigadier General, USAF (ret.) – The Citadel, The Military College of South Carolina
 Jack I. Gregory, former Commander, Pacific Air Forces (PACAF); General, USAF (ret.) – University of Kentucky
 Phil Hardberger, former Mayor of San Antonio, Texas; former Captain, USAF – Texas Tech University
 Henry Hartsfield, Astronaut; Colonel, USAF (ret.) – Auburn University
 Michael Hayden, former Director, Central Intelligence Agency (CIA) and former Director, National Security Agency (NSA); General, USAF (ret.) – Duquesne University
 Guy L. Hecker, former Director of the Office of Legislative Liaison, Office of the Secretary of the Air Force, Washington, D.C., Major General, USAF (ret.) – The Citadel, The Military College of South Carolina
 Paul V. Hester, former Commander, Pacific Air Forces (PACAF); General, USAF (ret.) – University of Mississippi
 Van Hilleary, US Congressman from Tennessee (R-TN); Colonel, USAFR – University of Tennessee
 Hal M. Hornburg, former Commander, Air Combat Command (ACC); General, USAF (ret.) – Texas A&M University
 Charles A. Horner, former Commander, U.S. Space Command (USSPACECOM) and North American Aerospace Defense Command (NORAD); commanded U.S. and Allied/Coalition air operations during Operation Desert Shield and Desert Storm; General, USAF (ret.) – University of Iowa
 Gilmary Michael Hostage III, Commander, U.S. Air Forces Central Command (USAFCENT); Lieutenant General, USAF – Duke University
 Kristin Hubbard, Advance Pilot/Narrator (Thunderbird #8), USAF Air Demonstration Squadron/United States Air Force Thunderbirds; Captain, USAF – University of Washington
 Andrew P. Iosue, former Commander, Air Training Command (ATC); General, USAF (ret.) – University of Massachusetts
 John P. Jumper, former Air Force Chief of Staff; former Commander, Air Combat Command (ACC); former Commander, U.S. Air Forces in Europe (USAFE); General, USAF (ret.) – Virginia Military Institute
 Robert Kehler, Commander, Air Force Space Command (AFSPC); General, USAF – Pennsylvania State University
 Ronald E. Keys, former Commander, Air Combat Command (ACC); General, USAF (ret.) – Kansas State University
 James M. Kowalski, Commander, Air Force Global Strike Command; Lieutenant General, USAF – University of Cincinnati
 Lance A. Kildron, former Commander, 77th Fighter Squadron; Colonel, USAF – Louisiana Tech University
David A. Krumm, Commander Alaskan Command; Lieutenant General, USAF - Auburn University
 Daniel P. Leaf, former Deputy Commander, U.S. Pacific Command (USPACOM); Lieutenant General, USAF (ret.) – University of Wisconsin–Madison
 Timothy Leahy, Commander, Curtis E. LeMay Center for Doctrine Development and Education, and Vice Commander, Air University; Major General The Citadel, The Military College of South Carolina
 Arthur J. Lichte, former Commander, Air Mobility Command (AMC); General, USAF (ret.) – Manhattan College
 Lance W. Lord, former Commander, Air Force Space Command (AFSPC); former Commander, Air University (AU); General, USAF (ret.) – Otterbein College
 Lester Lyles, former Commander, Air Force Materiel Command (AFMC); General, USAF (ret.) – Howard University
 Charles W. Lyon, Director of Operations, Air Combat Command; Commander, Air Forces Afghanistan; Major General, USAF – The Citadel, The Military College of South Carolina
 Antonio Maldonado, former Chief, Office of Defense Cooperation – Madrid, Spain; Brigadier General, USAF (ret.) – University of Puerto Rico
 James P. McCarthy, former Deputy Commander, U.S. European Command (USEUCOM); former Commander, 8th Air Force; General, USAF (ret.)- Kent State University
 Pamela Melroy, Astronaut; Colonel, USAF (ret.) – Wellesley College (commissioned via AFROTC Det 365 at Massachusetts Institute of Technology)
 Richard L. Meyer, Vice Commander 12th Air Force, Brigadier General, USAF (ret.) – The Citadel, The Military College of South Carolina
 Charles C. McDonald, former Commander, Air Force Logistics Command (AFLC); General, USAF (ret.) – University of Wisconsin–Madison
 Craig R. McKinley, Chief of the National Guard Bureau (NGB), former Director, Air National Guard (ANG) and former Commander, 1st Air Force; General, USAF – Southern Methodist University
 Richard W. McKinney, Senior Executive Service; Deputy Under Secretary of the Air Force for Space Programs; Colonel, USAF (ret.) – Washington State University
 Merrill A. McPeak, former Chief of Staff of the Air Force and former Commander, Pacific Air Forces (PACAF); General, USAF (ret.) – San Diego State
 Richard O. Middleton, Mobilization Assistant to the Director of Logistics, Air Mobility Command (AMC); Brigadier General, USAFR – The Citadel, The Military College of South Carolina
 Kenneth Minihan, former Director, National Security Agency (NSA); Lieutenant General, USAF (ret.) – Florida State University
 Thomas S. Moorman Jr., former Vice Chief of Staff of the Air Force and former Commander, Air Force Space Command (AFSPC); General, USAF (ret.) – Dartmouth College
 T. Michael Moseley, former Chief of Staff of the Air Force, former Vice Chief of Staff of the Air Force, and former Commander, 9th Air Force; commanded U.S. and Allied air operations during Operation Enduring Freedom and Iraqi Freedom; General, USAF (ret.) – Texas A&M University
 Richard B. Myers, former Chairman of the Joint Chiefs of Staff; former Commander, U.S. Space Command (USSPACECOM) and North American Aerospace Defense Command (NORAD); former Commander, Pacific Air Forces (PACAF); General, USAF (ret.) – Kansas State University
 Lloyd W. Newton, former Commander, Air Education and Training Command (AETC); first African-American U.S. Air Force Thunderbirds pilot, General, USAF (ret.) – Tennessee State University
 Gary L. North – Commander, Pacific Air Forces (PACAF); General, USAF – East Carolina University
 Scott O'Grady, Major, USAFR – Embry-Riddle Aeronautical University (Prescott, Arizona campus)
 Ellison Onizuka, Astronaut (Killed in Space Shuttle Challenger, STS-51-L disaster), Colonel, USAF (deceased) – University of Colorado at Boulder
 Samuel C. Phillips, former Commander, Air Force Systems Command (AFSC) and former Director, National Security Agency (NSA); General, USAF (ret., deceased) – University of Wyoming
 Richard A. Platt, former ANG Mobilization Assistant to the Commander, U.S. Air Forces in Europe (USAFE); Major General, USAF / Air National Guard (ret.) – New Jersey Institute of Technology
 Joseph W. Ralston, former Commander, U.S. European Command (USEUCOM) and former Commander, Air Combat Command (ACC); General, USAF (ret.) – Miami University
 Antonio J. Ramos, former Commander, Air Force Security Assistance Center; Brigadier General, USAF (ret.) – University of Puerto Rico
 Thomas C. Richards, former Deputy Commander, U.S. European Command (USEUCOM) and former Commander, Air University (AU); General, USAF (ret.) – Virginia Polytechnic Institute
 Cesar "Rico" Rodriguez, F-15 pilot with 2 aerial victories during Desert Storm in 1991, one MIG kill over Kosovo 1999, the fighter pilot with the most victories since Vietnam, Colonel, USAF (ret.) – The Citadel, The Military College of South Carolina
 Marc E. Rogers, Inspector General of the Air Force; Lieutenant General, USAF – University of Missouri
 John W. Rosa, former Superintendent U.S. Air Force Academy; Lieutenant General, USAF (ret.) – The Citadel, The Military College of South Carolina
 Mark Rosenker, former Mobilization Assistant to the Secretary of the Air Force, former MA to the Commander, Air Force Reserve Command, Major General USAF (ret)- University of Maryland
 Robert D. Russ, former Commander, Tactical Air Command (TAC); General, USAF (ret., deceased) – Washington State University
 Robert L. Rutherford, former Commander, U.S. Transportation Command (USTRANSCOM) and former Commander, Air Mobility Command (AMC); General, USAF (ret.) – Southwest Texas State University
 John B. Sams Jr., former Vice Commander, Air Mobility Command, Commander, 15th Air Force; Lieutenant General, USAF (ret.) – The Citadel, The Military College of South Carolina
 Ellie G. "Buck" Shuler Jr., former Commander 8th Air Force, Lieutenant General, USAF (ret.) – The Citadel, The Military College of South Carolina
 David Lamar Smith, F-4 pilot with 353 combat missions in Vietnam, pilot in first USAF Aggressor Squadron, Commander and Flight Leader of the Thunderbirds; Lieutenant Colonel, USAF – The Citadel, The Military College of South Carolina
 Charles F. Wald, former Deputy Commander, U.S. European Command (USEUCOM); General, USAF (ret.) – North Dakota State University
 Claudius E. Watts III, former Comptroller, U.S. Air Force, former college President, Lieutenant General, USAF (ret.) – The Citadel, The Military College of South Carolina
 Walter E. Webb III, Director for operations, Defense Nuclear Agency, Washington, D.C.; Major General, USAF (ret.) – The Citadel, The Military College of South Carolina
 William Welser III, former Commander, 18th Air Force; Lieutenant General, USAF (ret.) – University at Buffalo
 Scott D. West, Vice Commander 13th Air Force, Pacific Air Forces (PACAF); Brigadier General, USAF – The Citadel, The Military College of South Carolina
 Wallace W. Whaley, Commander 4th Air Force; Assistant to the Commander, Air Force Reserve; Major General, USAFR (ret) – The Citadel, The Military College of South Carolina
 Randy Witt, Director of command, control, communications and computer systems, U.S. European Command (USEUCOM); Brigadier General, USAF (ret.) – The Citadel, The Military College of South Carolina
John L. Wilkinson, Mobilization Assistant to the Director of Intelligence, Surveillance and Reconnaissance, Deputy Chief of Staff for Air and Space Operations, HQ USAF; Mobilization Assistant to the Commander, Air Intelligence Agency; Brigadier General, USAFR (ret.) – Georgetown University
 Margaret H. Woodward, Vice Commander, 18th Air Force and Prospective Commander, 17th Air Force; Brigadier General (Major General selectee), USAF – Arizona State University
 Kenneth S. Wilsbach, Commander, 18th Wing; Brigadier General, USAF – University of Florida
 Ronald D. Yaggi, Director, Regional Affairs, Office of the Deputy Under Secretary of the Air Force for International Affairs; Air Force member, Delegation to Inter-American Defense Board; and Air Force member, Joint Mexico-U.S. Defense Commission, Brigadier General, USAF (ret.) – The Citadel, The Military College of South Carolina

Resources 
 AFROTC HQ official website

See also 
 Army Reserve Officers' Training  Corps
 Early Commissioning Program
 Naval Reserve Officers Training Corps
 Air Force Officer Training School
 Army University
 General US military ROTC overview

References

External links 
 Headquarters U.S. Air Force ROTC - Official Web site
 U.S. Air Force ROTC - About Air Force ROTC

United States Air Force military education and training
Air Force Reserve Officer Training Corps